James Black (March 6, 1793 – June 21, 1872) was a Jacksonian and Democratic member of the U.S. House of Representatives from Pennsylvania.

James Black was born in Newport, Pennsylvania.  He was a member of the Pennsylvania House of Representatives in 1830 and 1831.

Black was elected as a Jacksonian to the Twenty-fourth Congress to fill the vacancy caused by the resignation of Jesse Miller.  He served as associate judge of Perry County, Pennsylvania, in 1842 and 1843.

He was again elected as a Democrat to the Twenty-eighth and Twenty-ninth Congresses.  After his time in congress, he served as State collector of tolls on the Juniata Canal.  He died in New Bloomfield, Pennsylvania, in 1872.  Interment in New Bloomfield Cemetery.

References

The Political Graveyard

1793 births
1872 deaths
Democratic Party members of the Pennsylvania House of Representatives
Pennsylvania state court judges
Jacksonian members of the United States House of Representatives from Pennsylvania
19th-century American politicians
Democratic Party members of the United States House of Representatives from Pennsylvania
People from Newport, Pennsylvania